The Lilongwe Golf Club is a multi-sports venue in Lilongwe, Malawi. In November 2019, it was selected to host the first four matches of the 2019 Kwacha Cup, a Twenty20 International (T20I) cricket series between Malawi and Mozambique.

See also
 Malawi national cricket team

External links
 Cricinfo profile

References

Sport in Malawi